The National Assembly (commonly abbreviated "DNA") is the Parliament, representing the legislative branch of government in Suriname. It is a unicameral legislature. The assembly has been situated in the former park house at the Independence Square in Paramaribo, after a fire destroyed the old building of representation on 1 August 1996. A reconstruction of the old building was completed in 2022.

The 51 members of parliament are elected every five years by open list proportional representation on the basis of the country's component districts. The most recent elections were held on 25 May 2020. The current Chairman of the Assembly, Marinus Bee, was appointed on 14 July 2020. Dew Sharman was appointed as Vice Chairman on 29 June 2020.

History 

The first representation was formed by the Colonial States, from 1866. The name was changed to Estates of Suriname in 1936. When Suriname became an independent republic on 25 November 1975, the representation was named Parliament of the Republic of Suriname. This Parliament was made inoperative during the coup d'état of 1980. In 1985, the Parliament was replaced by an appointed Assembly. The National Assembly, in its current form, dates from 1987. In that year, democracy was reestablished after the coup and a new constitution was adopted, organizing the Assembly, so new elections could be held on 25 November 1987. From here on, elections were held.

In some cases, a two-thirds majority is required, like the election of the President. If those votes fail, De Verenigde Volksvergadering (the United People's Assembly) is called. In those meetings, the Districts and Resorts will participate, and vote on the issue by majority.

Chairmen since 1975 

From December 1973, Emile Wijntuin was the Chairman of the Estates of Suriname, and remained Chairman of Parliament after Independence, until it was dissolved in August 1980.

After the elections in 1987, Jagernath Lachmon (VHP) became Chairman, an office which he already had taken twice in the Estates of Suriname. Lachmon resigned in 1996, because he could not agree with the Wijdenbosch government.

On 10 October 1996, Marijke Djwalapersad (BVD) was elected as Chair, becoming the first woman in Suriname's history to assume this office. On 24 July 2000, Djwalapersad was succeeded by Jagernath Lachmon, who remained in office until his death in 2001. His fellow party man Ramdien Sardjoe took his place.

After the elections of 2005, Paul Somohardjo of Pertjajah Luhur (a party that was part of the New Front combination) wanted to become Vice President of Suriname. This did not seem feasible, since he was convicted in August 2003 for defamation, which resulted in a suspended two-month sentence and his removal as minister. Within the coalition was decided to make Ramdien Sardjoe vice president and Somohardjo Chairman of the National Assembly.

On 30 June 2005, Somohardjo was elected to the proposed office with 29 out of 50 votes. Caprino Alendy (BEP/A-Combination) was elected as vice-Chairman, with the same number of votes.

On 30 June 2010, Jennifer Simons of Dési Bouterse's NDP/MC surprisingly won the office from Somohardjo, with 26 votes against 24 votes, and became the incumbent Chair of the Assembly. Ruth Wijdenbosch was elected as Vice Chair with 25 votes, one more than her rival, Anton Paal (PALU/MC). Remarkable is the fact that this is the first time that these offices are held by opposing politicians. It is also the first time that both offices are held by women.

On 29 June 2020, Ronnie Brunswijk was elected as Chairperson of the National Assembly in an uncontested election. Dew Sharman was elected as Vice Chairperson. After Brunswijk was elected Vice President of Suriname on 13 July 2020, Marinus Bee was installed as his successor on 14 July 2020.

Composition 
In the elections of 25 May 2020, the 51 parliamentary seats were allocated as follows:

See also 
 Chairman of the National Assembly of Suriname
 List of Chairmen of the Estates of Suriname
 Politics of Suriname
 List of legislatures by country

Notes

References

External links 
  

Politics of Suriname
Political organisations based in Suriname
Government of Suriname
Suriname
Suriname